The Naked Brigade is a 1965 Greek-American war film directed by Maury Dexter and starring Shirley Eaton, Ken Scott and Mary Chronopoulou. The screenplay concerns a British girl who becomes trapped on Crete during World War II.

Plot
During the German invasion of Crete in 1941, a British girl is trapped on the island. Eventually she joins the resistance fighters against the Nazis.

Cast
 Shirley Eaton as Diana Forsythe 
 Ken Scott as Christo 
 Mary Chronopoulou as Katina 
 John Holland as Maj. Hamilton 
 Sonia Zoidou as Athena 
 Kostas Baladimas as Manolakakis 
 Gikas Biniaris as Stavros Karrayiannis 
 Christoforos Himaras as Spyros Karrayiannis
 Patrick Kavanaugh as Lt. Bentley 
 Sokratis Korres as Lefteris Karrayiannis 
 Karl Nurk as Professor Forsythe 
 Nikos Papakonstantinou as Major Heilmann
 Clive Russell as Cpl. Reade 
 Aris Vlachopoulos as Father Nicholas 
 Eleni Zafeiriou as Sofia 
 Zannino as Yannis Karrayiannis

Production
The film was shot in Greece.

See also
List of American films of 1965

References

External links

1965 films
1960s English-language films
American World War II films
Greek World War II films
English-language Greek films
American war films
Universal Pictures films
Films directed by Maury Dexter
Films set in 1941
Films set in Crete
Films shot in Crete
Greek war films
1960s war films
1960s American films
Films about Greek resistance